The Locust Grove Stakes is a Grade III American Thoroughbred horse race for fillies and mares, age three and older, over a distance of  miles held annually in September during the early fall meeting at Churchill Downs in Louisville, Kentucky. The current purse is $400,000.

History

The event is named after the site known as Locust Grove where a 1790 Georgian  mansion is situated on 55 acres upriver from Louisville. The house was originally home to William and Lucy Clark Croghan. Lucy was the sister to explorers William Clark and George Rogers Clark. 
They are the ancestors to Churchill Downs founder Col. M. Lewis Clark.

The event was inaugurated on 31 May 1982 and was won by the Excitable Lady and was ridden by Champion jockey Darrel McHargue winning easily as the 3/10 odds-on favorite by 7 lengths  in a time of 1:37.20 over the one mile distance.

The following year the distance of the event was increased to  miles. 

In 1986 the event's conditions were modified to a handicap. The following the event was held on the turf for the first time over a distance of  miles and was won by longshot Luckiest Girl at 20-1. The following year the event was held at a shorter distance  miles.

Previously a Listed race, it was upgraded to Grade III status for 1998 by the American Graded Stakes Committee.

In winning the 2003 running of the Locust Grove Handicap, Ipi Tombe became the first horse bred in Zimbabwe to ever win a race at Churchill Downs.

The event was idle in 2011 and 2012 and when it was renewed in 2013 the event was set back to the dirt and since then the event has been moved to the September short fall meeting the conditions allowed for three year old fillies to compete against the older mares as a stakes allowance race. Also due to not being held for to years the event lost its Graded classification. In 2016 the event regained its Grade III status once again.  

In 2020 due to the COVID-19 pandemic in the United States, Churchill Downs did not schedule the event in their updated meeting.

Records

Speed record
 miles: 1:42.86 Shedaresthedevil (2021)
 miles: 1:46.75 Shaconage (2004)
 1 mile:  	1:35.76 Genuine Devotion (IRE) (2008)

Margins
8 lengths – Frivolous (2015) 

Most wins
 2 - Colstar (2000, 2001)

Most wins by a trainer
 4 - William I. Mott (1984, 1996, 1998, 2005)

Most wins by a jockey
 2 - Charles R. Woods Jr. (1986, 1989)
 2 - Shane Sellers (1995, 1998)
 2 - Pat Day (1983, 2003)
 2 - Brice Blanc (2004, 2005)
 2 - Jon Court (2001, 2015)
 2 - Julien R. Leparoux (2007, 2018)
 2 - Brian Hernandez Jr. (2017, 2019)

Most wins by an owner
 2 - Beverly R. Steinman (2000, 2001)
 2 - Team Valor (1993, 2003)
 2 - Glen Hill Farm (2006, 2009)
 2 - G. Watts Humphrey Jr. (2015, 2017)

Winners

Legend:

See also
 List of American and Canadian Graded races

References

Graded stakes races in the United States
Grade 3 stakes races in the United States
Mile category horse races for fillies and mares
Churchill Downs horse races
Recurring sporting events established in 1982
1982 establishments in Kentucky